Zé Pedro may refer to:
Zé Pedro (footballer, born 1978), Portuguese football midfielder and manager
Zé Pedro (footballer, born 1981), Portuguese football midfielder
Zé Pedro (footballer, born 1991), Portuguese football centre-back
Zé Pedro (footballer, born 1992), Portuguese football forward
Zé Pedro (footballer, born 1993), Portuguese football left-back
Zé Pedro (footballer, born 1997), Portuguese football winger